The 1957–58 Quaid-e-Azam Trophy was the fourth edition of the Quaid-e-Azam Trophy, the domestic first-class cricket competition in Pakistan.

Matches in the competition were played from 11 October 1957 to 16 March 1958, with the group stage matches played over three days, the semi-finals over four days, and the final over five days.

In the final, Bahawalpur defeated Karachi C by 211 runs, claiming their second title. Two Bahawalpur players, Iqbal Chaudhri and Israr Ali, led the competition in runs and wickets, respectively.

Group stage
The winner of each zone, marked in bold, qualified for the semi-finals.

 – Punjab beat Railways on first innings in a playoff match to advance to the semi-final.

Finals

Semi-finals

Final

Statistics

Most runs
The top five run-scorers are included in this table, listed by runs scored and then by batting average.

Most wickets

The top five wicket-takers are listed in this table, listed by wickets taken and then by bowling average.

References

Domestic cricket competitions in 1957–58
1957 in Pakistani cricket
1958 in Pakistani cricket
1957–58 Quaid-e-Azam Trophy